Hakawai, also Hokioi in the North Island, was to the New Zealand Māori people, a mythological bird that was sometimes heard but not usually seen.  It is now associated with the nocturnal aerial displays made by Coenocorypha snipe.

Mythology
In Māori mythology the Hakawai was one of eleven tapu (sacred) birds of Raka-maomao, a god of wind.  The Hakawai lived in the heavens and only descended to the earth at night.  It was considered to be a gigantic bird of prey and was described (as the Hokioi) by a Ngāti Apa chief, to the Governor of New Zealand Sir George Grey, as:

Hearing the Hakawai was considered to be a bad omen, traditionally presaging war.  Ornithologists in New Zealand have wondered whether the myth related to a real bird, whether extinct or still living, with some claiming that the myth was inspired by the now extinct Haast's eagle (Hieraaetus moorei).

Although mention of the Hakawai occurred in Māori mythology throughout New Zealand, since European settlement of the main islands direct experience of the Hakawai – through hearing the sounds it made – was largely restricted to the Muttonbird Islands, several small islands in the vicinity of Foveaux Strait and Stewart Island, in the far south of New Zealand.  The Muttonbird Islands have no permanent human residents but are visited seasonally, from mid-March to the end of May, for muttonbirding – the harvesting of sooty shearwater chicks for food and oil.  There the sound ascribed to the Hakawai was described as having two main components, the first part being vocal, a call rendered as hakwai, hakwai, hakwai, followed by a non-vocal roar as of an object travelling through the air at high speed.  It was heard on calm, moonlit nights and appeared to come from a great height.

Investigation
During the 1980s ornithologist Dr Colin Miskelly, who was studying the New Zealand snipe genus Coenocorypha, after hearing and recording the aerial display of the Chatham snipe (C. pusilla), investigated the possibility that the sounds attributed to the Hakawai in the Muttonbird Islands were made by the recently extinct South Island snipe (Coenocorypha iredalei), then usually called the Stewart Island snipe and considered to be a subspecies of the subantarctic snipe (Coenocorypha aucklandica), a small, unobtrusive, brown bird some 21–24 cm in length.

Miskelly interviewed several muttonbirders who had memories of hearing the distinctive sounds of the Hakawai.  He found that its apparent range had steadily decreased over the years to the early 1960s when it was heard no more.  The non-vocal sounds made by the Hakawai were described variously as "a sound as if a cable chain was lowered into a boat" a "jet-stream", a "blind rolling itself up" or "a shell passing overhead".  The reaction to the sounds by those who heard it was generally one of fright.

The decrease towards extinction paralleled that of the South Island snipe, of which the Muttonbird Islands were the final refuge, with the islands being progressively occupied by rats, feral cats and weka.  The last known individuals of the snipe died in 1964 on Big South Cape Island following the accidental introduction of black rats there.

Snipe in the genera Gallinago and Lymnocryptes, as well as the closely related woodcocks Scolopax, make courtship display flights, at dusk and on moonlit nights, producing mechanical sounds called "drumming", "bleating" or "winnowing", through the vibration of their modified outer tail feathers caused by the rush of air in the course of a power dive.  Of his research in the Chatham Islands Miskelly wrote:

and:

Examination of museum skins from bird collections showed such characteristic wear of the tail feathers on male snipe from the Chatham Islands (C. pusilla), islands off Stewart Island (C. iredalei), the Auckland Islands (C. aucklandica aucklandica), and the Antipodes Islands (C. a. meinertzhagenae).  Since then the same kind of tail-feather wear has been found on snipe from the Snares Islands (C. huegeli), and Hakawai displays have been heard in the Auckland and Antipodes Islands, as well as from the newly described Campbell snipe (C. a. perseverance) on Campbell Island.

See also
Poukai
Devil Bird a similar omen in Sri lankan folklore

References

Notes

Sources
 
 
 
 

Coenocorypha
Māori legendary creatures
Legendary birds
Bird sonation
Bird sounds